Adolphe de Chambrun (1831–1891) was a French historian, jurist and non-fiction writer.

Early life
Adolphe de Chambrun was born on August 10, 1831 in Marvejols, Lozère, France.

Career
De Chambrun was an historian and a jurist. He served as a legal attache at the Embassy of France, Washington, D.C.

De Chambrun was the author of several books on the United States.

Personal life and death
De Chambrun married Marie Henriette Hélène Marthe Tircuy de Corcelle. They had three sons: Pierre de Chambrun, Aldebert de Chambrun and Charles de Chambrun, and a daughter Thérèse, who married Pierre Savorgnan de Brazza. They resided on West 23rd Street in Chelsea, Manhattan, New York City, U.S.

De Chambrun died in 1891 in New York City.

Works

Further reading

References

External links
Chambrun, Adolphe de Pineton, marquis de, 1831-1891 at Internet Archive

1831 births
1891 deaths
People from Lozère
People from Chelsea, Manhattan
19th-century French historians
French jurists
French non-fiction writers
French expatriates in the United States
École Nationale des Chartes alumni
19th-century jurists